Salman Saqib Sheikh, credited as Mani, is a Pakistani actor, politician and host. Mani is mostly known for his comic roles. He started his career as an anchor and first roadshow host before becoming a sitcom and comedy actor. 

He is known for his roles in Meri Teri Kahani, Bandish and the telefilm Dil Toh Bacha Hai.

Life and career 
Mani was born on 22 March 1977 and was raised in a locality of Gulshan-e-Iqbal in Karachi. During an interview with Samina Peerzada, Mani explains that despite his father Saquib Sheikh was an actor and his elder sister Ayesha Mirza is an actress, he was interested in sports during his early days and did not think about venturing into the television. His initial interest grew after his minor appearance in a theatre with a theatre group Katha stars Sania Saeed and Nadia Jamil. He started his career in television as a junior anchor and host before becoming an actor. He wrote scripts for Fakhar-e-Alam's show Boom Boom Bastic aired on PTV.

Host 
In 2001, he hosted the first ever Road Show in Pakistan Television's history called Streets, aired on Indus Vision in which he conducts the show by asking issue based questions to general public of Pakistan. He introduced road shows in Pakistan. He also hosted two other road shows called Road Romeo and Sarrak Chhap aired on ATV and Geo TV respectively. 

After that he collaborated with show creator Azfar Ali, Adnan Shah Tipu and Salma Hasan in a sitcom Sub Set Hai and also did a Radio Show with director and actor Azfar Ali. After that he collaborated with a music channel called ARY Musik (The Musik at that time was headed by Azfar Ali) and started the political satire show Mani-ism which was based on current political and social news. 

A similar show Ulta Seedha, penned by Faisal Qureshi, co-hosted by Mani was also aired on Geo TV. Mani then hosted the first talk show Casual for newly founded Hum TV in 2006. After that Mani hosted a game show called Hero Ya Zero scripted by Asif Rasheed Bony. He started a brunch show called Hum 2 Humara Show co-hosted by his wife Hira. He also produced sitcoms Zerooos and Khala Surayya aired on Geo TV. He has also hosted several corporate shows in his career spanning over 2 decades.   

Mani also produced a sports show Champions on ARY Digital.

Politics 
Besides being an actor, Mani is also very active in politics. He actively supported Imran Khan's Pakistan Tehreek-e-Insaf and attended several processions across Pakistan  before joining Pak Sarzameen Party in 2018. He and his wife, Hira Mani have criticized Imran Khan and Altaf Hussain on several occasions.

Personal life 
He married fellow actress Hira Salman in 2008. Hira Salman, his wife in her interview at Speak Your Heart With Samina Peerzada on 19 Oct 2018  explained interesting story how she met Mani. She grabbed Mani's contact number from her friend's cellular phone (who was Mani's girlfriend) secretly & started talking to him on phone by name Mariam while she was also engaged to a Banker in Dubai at that time, whom she left afterwards and married Mani. Their marriage ceremony took place on 18 April 2008. They frequently work together in most of their projects after marriage. The couple has two sons: Muzammil (born in 2009) and Ibrahim (born in 2014).

Television

As host

As producer

As actor

Film

References 

Living people
People from Karachi
Pakistani male television actors
Pakistani male comedians
1976 births